James Freshwater Crussell (19 February 1904 – 11 December 1983) was an English footballer who played as an inside forward.

Club career
Crussell was educated at Watford Grammar School for Boys, going onto play for the school's representative football teams. Crussell later played for Leavesden Road Baptists and Sun Engraving, before signing for Watford as an amateur in August 1924. On 2 May 1925, Crussell made his only Football League appearance in a 0–0 draw against Charlton Athletic. Following his departure from Watford, Crussell signed for Tufnell Park, before joining Clapton, playing for the club for over a decade. In 1932, Crussell guested for Nunhead on their tour of Luxembourg.

International career
In 1932, Crussell made two appearances for England amateurs.

References

1904 births
1983 deaths
Sportspeople from Watford
Association football forwards
People educated at Watford Grammar School for Boys
English footballers
Watford F.C. players
Tufnell Park F.C. players
Clapton F.C. players
English Football League players
England amateur international footballers